The Smarty Jones Stakes is a Grade III American Thoroughbred horse race for three years olds, over a distance of one and one-sixteenth miles on the dirt track held annually in early September at Parx Casino and Racing racetrack in Bensalem, Pennsylvania.  The event currently carries a purse of $300,000.

History 
The race was inaugurated in 2010 with an attractive purse offered of $300,000 as a preparatory race for the Grade I Pennsylvania Derby where the winner was given automatic entry.

The event is named  in honor of the 2004 Kentucky Derby and Preakness Stakes winner, and hometown Pennsylvania hero Smarty Jones. 

Originally the distance of the event was set as 1 mile and 70 yards but was extended in 2016 to the current distance of  miles.

In 2020 due to the COVID-19 pandemic in the United States, Parx Racing did not schedule the event.

Records
Speed record: 
  miles – 1:42.27 - Pavel (2017)
 1 mile and 70 yards – 1:40.89 - Wilburn   (2011)

Margins: 
 7 lengths – Awesome Slew  (2016)

Most wins by a jockey  
2 – Paco Lopez: (2016, 2019)
2 – Joe Bravo: (2014, 2018)
2 – Florent Geroux: (2021, 2022)
Most wins by a trainer:

 2 – Steven M. Asmussen: (2010, 2011)
 2 – Brad H. Cox: (2021, 2022)

Most wins by an owner

 No owner won this race more than once

Winners

References 

Graded stakes races in the United States
Horse races in Pennsylvania
Grade 3 stakes races in the United States
Recurring sporting events established in 2010
Parx Casino and Racing
2010 establishments in Pennsylvania
Flat horse races for three-year-olds